Dunnsheath is a hamlet in Shropshire, England. It is sometimes spelt as "Dunn's Heath".

It is situated on the B5067, Shrewsbury to Baschurch road, in the parish of Pimhill. Just to the north is the small village of Leaton.

References

External links

Villages in Shropshire